The New Caledonian friarbird (Philemon diemenensis) is a species of bird in the family Meliphagidae.
It is endemic to New Caledonia.

References

Endemic birds of New Caledonia
Philemon (bird)
Birds described in 1831
Taxonomy articles created by Polbot